Betty Boop's Birthday Party is a 1933 Fleischer Studio animated short film, starring Betty Boop and featuring Koko the Clown and Bimbo.

Plot

It's Betty's birthday, but she's in the kitchen washing dishes and wishing she had a man.  Betty's pals, including Bimbo and Koko, throw her a party. Yet after two men have a scuffle with a fish, the entire party gets into a fight, leaving the entire party a mess. In the end, Betty rows away with George Washington.

References

External links
 Betty Boop's Birthday Party at the Big Cartoon Database
 Betty Boop's Birthday Party at IMDb
 Betty Boop's Birthday Party on YouTube

1933 films
Betty Boop cartoons
1930s American animated films
Articles containing video clips
American black-and-white films
1933 animated films
Films about birthdays
Paramount Pictures short films
Fleischer Studios short films
Short films directed by Dave Fleischer